The Raising of Lazarus is a 1619 oil on canvas painting by Guercino, now in the Louvre Museum in Paris. A preparatory sketch for the work is now in the Metropolitan Museum of Art, 

In 1682 it was recorded as being in the Naples collection of the brothers Carlo and Francesco Garofali.  It was still in that city when Vivant Denon bought it for Louis XVI for 26,000 livres in 1785 and after the French Revolution it was exhibited at the Muséum des Arts. JMW Turner saw it during the Peace of Amiens in 1802 and a copy of it appears in his "Louvre Sketchbook".

References

Paintings by Guercino
Paintings in the Louvre by Italian artists
Guercino